The 2000–01 Philadelphia Flyers season was the Philadelphia Flyers' 34th season in the National Hockey League (NHL). The Flyers lost in the first round to the Buffalo Sabres in six games.

Off-season
Craig Ramsay retained the head coaching position as Roger Neilson was not asked to return.

Regular season
Without Eric Lindros, who sat out the entire season awaiting a trade, while also suffering through John LeClair's 66-game absence and Brian Boucher's early erratic play in goal, the club went into an early tailspin. The team began the year 3–6–4 and at one point had six regulars out of the lineup. Keith Jones, who never fully recovered from the prior knee problems despite surgery last season, was forced to retire eight games into the schedule.

Not wanting to bank on the inexperience of Maxime Ouellet, the team recalled Roman Cechmanek, a former star goalie in the Czech Republic, from the Philadelphia Phantoms in early November and the move paid off as he recorded a pair of shutouts in his first three games. The Flyers won six in a row prior to Thanksgiving to climb above .500, but Ramsay's inability to rally the troops cost him his job. After being badly outplayed in early December losses to Ottawa (5–3) and Detroit (5–1), he was replaced by former Flyer great Bill Barber with the team sinking at 12–12–4.

Barber's high-energy, old-time hockey approach struck a chord, and the club went unbeaten in his first eight games behind the bench (5–0–3). Philly ran off an 8–2–1 stretch at the turn of the new year, then after a five-game win streak after the All-Star break found themselves atop the Atlantic Division.

Unfortunately, injuries and poor play followed. Simon Gagne was lost with a shoulder injury in a scoreless tie with the Tampa Bay Lightning in late February. In the middle of a 1–4–1 stretch in late March, Keith Primeau suffered a leg injury and missed the rest of the regular season. Despite faltering down the stretch, the Flyers finished with the fourth seed in the Eastern Conference.

Primeau led the team with 34 goals and Mark Recchi posted team-best 50 assists and 77 points. Dan McGillis and Eric Desjardins formed a potent offensive duo on the back line, combining for 29 goals and 97 points. Cechmanek recorded a franchise rookie record 10 shutouts and finished second in voting for the Vezina Trophy.

The Flyers were the most disciplined team in the League, with just 314 power-play opportunities against.

Season standings

Playoffs
The Flyers lost in the first round to the Buffalo Sabres in six games.

Schedule and results

Preseason

|- style="background:#cfc;"
| 1 || September 14 || @ New York Islanders || 4–2 || 1–0–0 ||
|- style="background:#cfc;"
| 2 || September 15 || New York Islanders || 2–1 || 2–0–0 ||
|- style="background:#cfc;"
| 3 || September 16 || New York Rangers || 5–1 || 3–0–0 ||
|- style="background:#fcf;"
| 4 || September 19 || @ New York Rangers || 3–4 || 3–1–0 ||
|- style="background:#cfc;"
| 5 || September 21 || Washington Capitals || 3–2 || 4–1–0 ||
|- style="background:#fcf;"
| 6 || September 23 || @ New Jersey Devils || 2–4 || 4–2–0 ||
|- style="background:#cfc;"
| 7 || September 27 || New Jersey Devils || 4–1 || 5–2–0 ||
|- style="background:#fcf;"
| 8 || September 30 || @ Washington Capitals || 1–2 || 5–3–0 ||
|-
| colspan="6" style="text-align:center;"|
Notes:
 Game played at Sovereign Bank Arena in Trenton, New Jersey.
|-

|-
| Legend:

Regular season

|- style="background:#cfc;"
| 1 || October 5 || Vancouver Canucks || 6–3 || 1–0–0–0 || 2 || 
|- style="background:#fcf;"
| 2 || October 7 || Boston Bruins || 1–5 || 1–1–0–0 || 2 || 
|- style="background:#ffc;"
| 3 || October 11 || @ Minnesota Wild || 3–3 OT || 1–1–1–0 || 3 || 
|- style="background:#fcf;"
| 4 || October 12 || @ Dallas Stars || 1–4 || 1–2–1–0 || 3 || 
|- style="background:#fcf;"
| 5 || October 14 || @ Phoenix Coyotes || 3–6 || 1–3–1–0 || 3 || 
|- style="background:#fcf;"
| 6 || October 17 || Ottawa Senators || 1–6 || 1–4–1–0 || 3 || 
|- style="background:#ffc;"
| 7 || October 19 || Montreal Canadiens || 3–3 OT || 1–4–2–0 || 4 || 
|- style="background:#fcf;"
| 8 || October 21 || Mighty Ducks of Anaheim || 3–4 || 1–5–2–0 || 4 || 
|- style="background:#cfc;"
| 9 || October 24 || @ New York Rangers || 5–4 || 2–5–2–0 || 6 || 
|- style="background:#cfc;"
| 10 || October 26 || New York Rangers || 3–0 || 3–5–2–0 || 8 || 
|- style="background:#ffc;"
| 11 || October 29 || Washington Capitals || 1–1 OT || 3–5–3–0 || 9 || 
|-

|- style="background:#ffc;"
| 12 || November 1 || @ New Jersey Devils || 1–1 OT || 3–5–4–0 || 10 || 
|- style="background:#fcf;"
| 13 || November 2 || Nashville Predators || 1–3 || 3–6–4–0 || 10 || 
|- style="background:#cfc;"
| 14 || November 4 || Buffalo Sabres || 3–0 || 4–6–4–0 || 12 || 
|- style="background:#fcf;"
| 15 || November 8 || @ Pittsburgh Penguins || 2–5 || 4–7–4–0 || 12 || 
|- style="background:#cfc;"
| 16 || November 9 || Edmonton Oilers || 2–0 || 5–7–4–0 || 14 || 
|- style="background:#cfc;"
| 17 || November 11 || Ottawa Senators || 4–3 || 6–7–4–0 || 16 || 
|- style="background:#cfc;"
| 18 || November 15 || @ Toronto Maple Leafs || 2–1 OT || 7–7–4–0 || 18 || 
|- style="background:#cfc;"
| 19 || November 17 || @ Atlanta Thrashers || 3–2 OT || 8–7–4–0 || 20 || 
|- style="background:#cfc;"
| 20 || November 18 || Washington Capitals || 5–3 || 9–7–4–0 || 22 || 
|- style="background:#cfc;"
| 21 || November 22 || @ Buffalo Sabres || 3–1 || 10–7–4–0 || 24 || 
|- style="background:#fcf;"
| 22 || November 24 || Pittsburgh Penguins || 0–1 || 10–8–4–0 || 24 || 
|- style="background:#fcf;"
| 23 || November 26 || Phoenix Coyotes || 1–2 || 10–9–4–0 || 24 || 
|- style="background:#cfc;"
| 24 || November 29 || @ Columbus Blue Jackets || 4–3 || 11–9–4–0 || 26 || 
|- style="background:#fcf;"
| 25 || November 30 || @ Carolina Hurricanes || 0–2 || 11–10–4–0 || 26 || 
|-

|- style="background:#fcf;"
| 26 || December 2 || @ Ottawa Senators || 3–5 || 11–11–4–0 || 26 || 
|- style="background:#cfc;"
| 27 || December 6 || Tampa Bay Lightning || 6–3 || 12–11–4–0 || 28 || 
|- style="background:#fcf;"
| 28 || December 8 || @ Detroit Red Wings || 1–5 || 12–12–4–0 || 28 || 
|- style="background:#cfc;"
| 29 || December 10 || New York Islanders || 5–2 || 13–12–4–0 || 30 || 
|- style="background:#ffc;"
| 30 || December 12 || @ Nashville Predators || 2–2 OT || 13–12–5–0 || 31 || 
|- style="background:#ffc;"
| 31 || December 13 || @ Colorado Avalanche || 3–3 OT || 13–12–6–0 || 32 || 
|- style="background:#cfc;"
| 32 || December 16 || New Jersey Devils || 6–3 || 14–12–6–0 || 34 || 
|- style="background:#ffc;"
| 33 || December 19 || @ Boston Bruins || 4–4 OT || 14–12–7–0 || 35 || 
|- style="background:#cfc;"
| 34 || December 21 || San Jose Sharks || 4–3 || 15–12–7–0 || 37 || 
|- style="background:#cfc;"
| 35 || December 23 || Carolina Hurricanes || 2–1 OT || 16–12–7–0 || 39 || 
|- style="background:#cfc;"
| 36 || December 27 || @ Florida Panthers || 5–2 || 17–12–7–0 || 41 || 
|- style="background:#fcf;"
| 37 || December 28 || @ Tampa Bay Lightning || 3–4 || 17–13–7–0 || 41 || 
|- style="background:#fcf;"
| 38 || December 30 || @ Washington Capitals || 3–6 || 17–14–7–0 || 41 || 
|-

|- style="background:#ffc;"
| 39 || January 2 || @ New Jersey Devils || 1–1 OT || 17–14–8–0 || 42 || 
|- style="background:#cfc;"
| 40 || January 5 || @ Atlanta Thrashers || 6–4 || 18–14–8–0 || 44 || 
|- style="background:#ffc;"
| 41 || January 6 || Atlanta Thrashers || 2–2 OT || 18–14–9–0 || 45 || 
|- style="background:#cfc;"
| 42 || January 8 || @ St. Louis Blues || 2–1 OT || 19–14–9–0 || 47 || 
|- style="background:#cfc;"
| 43 || January 12 || @ Tampa Bay Lightning || 3–0 || 20–14–9–0 || 49 || 
|- style="background:#cfc;"
| 44 || January 13 || @ Florida Panthers || 4–1 || 21–14–9–0 || 51 || 
|-
| 45 || January 16 || @ New York Rangers || 3–4 OT || 21–14–9–1 || 52 || 
|- style="background:#fcf;"
| 46 || January 18 || New Jersey Devils || 1–7 || 21–15–9–1 || 52 || 
|- style="background:#cfc;"
| 47 || January 20 || Florida Panthers || 5–3 || 22–15–9–1 || 54 || 
|- style="background:#cfc;"
| 48 || January 22 || Los Angeles Kings || 3–0 || 23–15–9–1 || 56 || 
|- style="background:#cfc;"
| 49 || January 25 || @ Chicago Blackhawks || 5–1 || 24–15–9–1 || 58 || 
|- style="background:#cfc;"
| 50 || January 27 || @ Carolina Hurricanes || 4–3 || 25–15–9–1 || 60 || 
|- style="background:#fcf;"
| 51 || January 28 || @ Washington Capitals || 2–4 || 25–16–9–1 || 60 || 
|- style="background:#cfc;"
| 52 || January 31 || @ Pittsburgh Penguins || 5–1 || 26–16–9–1 || 62 || 
|-

|- style="background:#cfc;"
| 53 || February 1 || New York Islanders || 2–0 || 27–16–9–1 || 64 || 
|- style="background:#fcf;"
| 54 || February 6 || @ Boston Bruins || 3–4 || 27–17–9–1 || 64 || 
|- style="background:#fcf;"
| 55 || February 7 || @ Pittsburgh Penguins || 4–9 || 27–18–9–1 || 64 || 
|- style="background:#cfc;"
| 56 || February 9 || @ New York Islanders || 5–2 || 28–18–9–1 || 66 || 
|- style="background:#cfc;"
| 57 || February 14 || @ New York Islanders || 3–1 || 29–18–9–1 || 68 || 
|- style="background:#cfc;"
| 58 || February 15 || Toronto Maple Leafs || 5–2 || 30–18–9–1 || 70 || 
|- style="background:#cfc;"
| 59 || February 17 || Atlanta Thrashers || 5–1 || 31–18–9–1 || 72 || 
|- style="background:#cfc;"
| 60 || February 19 || Carolina Hurricanes || 4–0 || 32–18–9–1 || 74 || 
|-
| 61 || February 22 || @ New York Islanders || 3–4 OT || 32–18–9–2 || 75 || 
|- style="background:#ffc;"
| 62 || February 24 || Tampa Bay Lightning || 0–0 OT || 32–18–10–2 || 76 || 
|- style="background:#cfc;"
| 63 || February 25 || New York Rangers || 2–1 || 33–18–10–2 || 78 || 
|- style="background:#fcf;"
| 64 || February 27 || Montreal Canadiens || 2–3 || 33–19–10–2 || 78 || 
|-

|- style="background:#cfc;"
| 65 || March 1 || Buffalo Sabres || 2–0 || 34–19–10–2 || 80 || 
|- style="background:#fcf;"
| 66 || March 3 || @ Montreal Canadiens || 1–3 || 34–20–10–2 || 80 || 
|- style="background:#cfc;"
| 67 || March 5 || Boston Bruins || 6–4 || 35–20–10–2 || 82 || 
|- style="background:#cfc;"
| 68 || March 8 || Calgary Flames || 5–2 || 36–20–10–2 || 84 || 
|- style="background:#fcf;"
| 69 || March 10 || New Jersey Devils || 2–3 || 36–21–10–2 || 84 || 
|- style="background:#cfc;"
| 70 || March 13 || St. Louis Blues || 5–2 || 37–21–10–2 || 86 || 
|- style="background:#cfc;"
| 71 || March 15 || Minnesota Wild || 3–0 || 38–21–10–2 || 88 || 
|- style="background:#cfc;"
| 72 || March 17 || New York Rangers || 2–1 || 39–21–10–2 || 90 || 
|- style="background:#cfc;"
| 73 || March 19 || @ Edmonton Oilers || 4–2 || 40–21–10–2 || 92 || 
|- style="background:#fcf;"
| 74 || March 22 || @ Calgary Flames || 1–3 || 40–22–10–2 || 92 || 
|- style="background:#fcf;"
| 75 || March 24 || @ Toronto Maple Leafs || 3–5 || 40–23–10–2 || 92 || 
|- style="background:#ffc;"
| 76 || March 26 || @ Ottawa Senators || 3–3 OT || 40–23–11–2 || 93 || 
|- style="background:#fcf;"
| 77 || March 29 || Toronto Maple Leafs || 1–2 || 40–24–11–2 || 93 || 
|- style="background:#cfc;"
| 78 || March 31 || Detroit Red Wings || 1–0 || 41–24–11–2 || 95 || 
|-

|- style="background:#fcf;"
| 79 || April 3 || Florida Panthers || 1–2 || 41–25–11–2 || 95 || 
|-
| 80 || April 5 || @ Montreal Canadiens || 2–3 OT || 41–25–11–3 || 96 || 
|- style="background:#cfc;"
| 81 || April 7 || Pittsburgh Penguins || 4–3 OT || 42–25–11–3 || 98 || 
|- style="background:#cfc;"
| 82 || April 8 || @ Buffalo Sabres || 2–1 || 43–25–11–3 || 100 || 
|-

|-
| Legend:

Playoffs

|- style="background:#fcf;"
| 1 || April 11 || Buffalo Sabres || 1–2 || Sabres lead 1–0 || 
|- style="background:#fcf;"
| 2 || April 14 || Buffalo Sabres || 3–4 OT || Sabres lead 2–0 || 
|- style="background:#cfc;"
| 3 || April 16 || @ Buffalo Sabres || 3–2 || Sabres lead 2–1 || 
|- style="background:#fcf;"
| 4 || April 17 || @ Buffalo Sabres || 3–4 OT || Sabres lead 3–1 || 
|- style="background:#cfc;"
| 5 || April 19 || Buffalo Sabres || 1–3 || Sabres lead 3–2 || 
|- style="background:#fcf;"
| 6 || April 21 || @ Buffalo Sabres || 0–8 || Sabres win 4–2 || 
|-

|-
| Legend:

Player statistics

Scoring
 Position abbreviations: C = Center; D = Defense; G = Goaltender; LW = Left Wing; RW = Right Wing
  = Joined team via a transaction (e.g., trade, waivers, signing) during the season. Stats reflect time with the Flyers only.
  = Left team via a transaction (e.g., trade, waivers, release) during the season. Stats reflect time with the Flyers only.

Goaltending

Awards and records

Awards

Records

Among the team records set during the 2000–01 season was the Flyers taking two minutes and nineteen seconds to score the fastest three goals from the start of a period in team history on January 5 against the Atlanta Thrashers. The Flyers three overtime losses during the season tied the mark for fewest set during the previous season.

Milestones

Transactions
The Flyers were involved in the following transactions from June 11, 2000, the day after the deciding game of the 2000 Stanley Cup Finals, through June 9, 2001, the day of the deciding game of the 2001 Stanley Cup Finals.

Trades

Players acquired

Players lost

Signings

Draft picks

Philadelphia's picks at the 2000 NHL Entry Draft, which was held at the Canadian Airlines Saddledome in Calgary on June 24–25, 2000. The Flyers traded their second-round pick, 63rd overall, Rod Brind'Amour, and Jean-Marc Pelletier to the Carolina Hurricanes for Keith Primeau and the Hurricanes' fifth-round pick, 148th overall, on January 23, 2000. They also traded their fifth-round pick, 165th overall, and Dave Babych to the Los Angeles Kings for Steve Duchesne on March 23, 1999, and their ninth-round pick, 291st overall, to the Chicago Blackhawks for Mark Janssens on June 12, 2000.

Farm teams
The Flyers were affiliated with the Philadelphia Phantoms of the AHL and the Trenton Titans of the ECHL.

Notes

References
General
 
 
 
Specific

Phil
Phil
2000
Philadelphia
Philadelphia